Roja Port is the port authority of Roja, Latvia. The port is located at the mouth of  Roja River.

References

External links 
 Roja Port website

Ports and harbours of Latvia
Port authorities